Teerawut Sanphan (born July 29, 1979) is a Thai former footballer.

References

External links
 Thai Port FC squad list

1979 births
Living people
Teerawut Sanphan
Association football midfielders
Teerawut Sanphan
Teerawut Sanphan
Teerawut Sanphan